Probable leucyl-tRNA synthetase, mitochondrial is an enzyme that in humans is encoded by the LARS2 gene.

This gene encodes a class 1 aminoacyl-tRNA synthetase, mitochondrial leucyl-tRNA synthetase. Each of the twenty aminoacyl-tRNA synthetases catalyzes the aminoacylation of a specific tRNA or tRNA isoaccepting family with the cognate amino acid.

References

Further reading

Biology of bipolar disorder